The style of Portuguese sovereign has varied over the years. Currently, there is no Portuguese monarch but there is a pretender: Duarte Pio, Duke of Braganza. He styles himself following some of the ancient traditions of the Portuguese monarchy.

Style of Title 
During the history of Portuguese monarchy, the Portuguese kings used the following styles:

Style of Address 
The attribute of the Portuguese sovereign also changed several times as well:

See also 
List of titles and honours of the Portuguese Crown
List of Portuguese monarchs

References

Portuguese monarchy
Royal styles